Turosteride (FCE-26,073) is a selective inhibitor of the enzyme 5α-reductase which was under investigation by GlaxoSmithKline for the treatment of benign prostatic hyperplasia (BPH), but was never marketed. Similarly to finasteride, turosteride is selective for the type II isoform of 5α-redcutase, with about 15-fold selectivity for it over type I isoform of the enzyme. In animal studies it has been shown to inhibit prostate size and retard tumor growth. It may also be useful for the treatment of acne and hair loss.

See also 
 5α-Reductase inhibitor
 FCE 28,260

References 

5α-Reductase inhibitors
Delta-lactams
Ureas
Abandoned drugs